Frans Hals Museum - Hal (until March 29 2018: De Hallen Haarlem) is one of the two locations of the Frans Hals Museum, located on the Grote Markt, Haarlem, Netherlands, where modern and contemporary art is on display in alternating presentations. The emphasis is on contemporary photograph and video presentations, with the focus on Man and society. 

The museum consists of three different buildings, the Vleeshal (Flesher's hall) on the east side and the Verweyhal (named for Kees Verwey) on the west side are two large "halls" sandwiching the small entrance building. All three buildings are National Heritage sites today.

De Vleeshal building 

The Vleeshal was built in the years 1602 to 1605 and was originally a ‘meat hall’ where butchers sold their goods.  The heads of bulls and rams on the façades are reminders of the original function of the building. It is an example of Dutch Renaissance architecture, with Renaissance ornaments being applied on a basic Gothic structure (floor plan and outer walls). The Renaissance forms include pilasters, rustication, Tuscan (interior) pillars, scrollwork (above the cellar entrances) and obelisks. Sample prints by Hans Vredeman de Vries from Antwerp provided a source of inspiration for this. De Vleeshal was built by Lieven de Key, the town architect, commissioned by the city government, which judging by the finished building had a substantial treasury at the time.  It remained a meat hall all the way into the 19th century.

The building later fulfilled a totally different function; from 1840 to 1885 it served as a storehouse for a garrison quartered in Haarlem. Later the building served as a Public Records Office, and after that as a depot for the municipal library. During the Second World War the building was occupied by the Distribution Service.

After World War II, the Mayor and Aldermen decreed that the building should become an exhibition hall, and the first exhibitions were held in 1950. De Hallen Haarlem organises alternating exhibitions of contemporary art on two storeys, throughout summer combined with modern art. The Archeological Museum is in the cellar.

Entrance building 

The little ‘fish house’ in between the two main halls was once the home of the servant of the fish market across the square and serves as the entrance for Frans Hals Museum - Hal today.

Verweyhal 

The Verweyhal is a former society meeting hall next to the main entrance on the corner of the Grote Markt and the Grote Houtstraat, where the former main entrance to it is located. The Verweyhal was built in the 19th century as a home for the Haarlem gentlemen’s society Trou moet Blycken.

The building is in the Eclectic style and also contains some art deco features in the interior though it has been renovated beyond recognition since 1880. It became a modern art exhibition hall in 1992 when the Kees Verwey Foundation renovated it and gave the artist's oeuvre to the Frans Hals Museum.

References

External links
Frans Hals Museum website

Art museums and galleries in the Netherlands
Frans Hals Museum
Rijksmonuments in Haarlem
Museums in Haarlem